Ladda plancus is a species of butterfly in the family Hesperiidae. It is found in Peru and Bolivia.

References

Butterflies described in 1874
Hesperiidae of South America
Taxa named by Carl Heinrich Hopffer